John Olive (born March 1, 1955) is a former American basketball player and coach. Olive attended Bishop Eustace Preparatory School, in Pennsauken, New Jersey, then played collegiate basketball at Villanova University, where he graduated in 1977.

Olive was drafted in the eighth round of the 1977 NBA draft by the Philadelphia 76ers.  He played in the NBA for the San Diego Clippers from 1978 through 1980.  He also played for the Alberta Dusters in the Continental Basketball Association in the 1980–81 season.

Olive was an assistant coach at Villanova under Rollie Massimino, from 1985 to 1992.  He was named head coach at Loyola Marymount in 1992, where he served for five seasons.

Olive is currently the Head Boys Basketball Coach at Torrey Pines High School in Del Mar, California.

At Torrey Pines High School, Olive has led the Falcons to unprecedented success. Since taking over at Torrey Pines Olive has won 583 games. Olive has won 19 league championships, including 10 in a row. In his time with the Falcons Olive has won 4 CIF San Diego Section Championships.

References

External links
College & NBA stats @ basketballreference.com

1955 births
Living people
Alberta Dusters players
American expatriate basketball people in Canada
American men's basketball coaches
American men's basketball players
Basketball coaches from New Jersey
Basketball players from New Jersey
Basketball players from Philadelphia
Bishop Eustace Preparatory School alumni
College men's basketball head coaches in the United States
High school basketball coaches in California
Loyola Marymount Lions men's basketball coaches
Philadelphia 76ers draft picks
San Diego Clippers announcers
San Diego Clippers players
Small forwards
Villanova Wildcats men's basketball coaches
Villanova Wildcats men's basketball players